Loretz House is a historic home located near Lincolnton, Lincoln County, North Carolina.  It was built in 1793, and is a two-story, five bay by two bay, brick dwelling.  It has a gable roof and features patterned brickwork. The interior has a number of Georgian style decorative elements. Also on the property is a contributing brick smokehouse.

It was listed on the National Register of Historic Places in 1972.

References

Houses on the National Register of Historic Places in North Carolina
Georgian architecture in North Carolina
Houses completed in 1793
Houses in Lincoln County, North Carolina
National Register of Historic Places in Lincoln County, North Carolina